Mirror of the Polish Crown (full title Mirror of the Polish Crown expressing the profound insults and great anxieties it receives from the Jews) is an antisemitic pamphlet published in 1618 by Sebastian Miczyński, professor of philosophy at Cracow Jagellonian University. Because this pamphlet was one of the causes of the anti-Jewish riots in Cracow, to the petition from local Jews, it was censored by Sigismund III Vasa. Despite this, the book run through numerous reprints.

In this pamphlet Jews were accused of political treachery, robbery, swindling, murder, witchcraft, and sacrilege; however religious accusations are of secondary importance. The pamphlet mainly focuses on the economic activities of the Jews and advocates the expulsion of the Jews from Poland.

References

External links 
 Online scanned book

Jewish Polish history
Antisemitic publications
Antisemitism in Poland
Censored books